Trox acanthinus is a species of hide beetle in the subfamily Troginae.

References

acanthinus
Beetles described in 1872